Venba is an upcoming narrative cooking video game developed and published by Visai Games. The game is scheduled for a mid-2023 release on Microsoft Windows, Nintendo Switch, PlayStation 5, Xbox One and Xbox Series X/S. Venba starts in the 1980s, and takes place over the course of several years. The player controls the titular character, Venba, an Indian mother who leaves India to move to Canada with her husband and son.

Gameplay
The core gameplay involves Venba trying to restore her lost recipes through trial and error. Venba's mother's old cookbook contains the recipes the player will try to recreate, but the cookbook has gotten damaged, so some instructions are smudged, or do not make sense to someone unfamiliar with certain utensils or ingredients.

Development
In an interview with Eurogamer, lead developer Abhi explains that a lot of media that relates to immigrant stories mostly focuses on the second-generation children, rather than their parents, but that the parents have "a cooler story to tell, because they up and leave their country at the age of 40 or 50, and they move to a brand new place." Venba will be told from the perspective of the mother, and how cooking becomes a way for her to keep in touch with her roots. 

Visai Games had to deal with the challenge of making a cooking game that is interesting to players who are familiar with the recipes, without making the game too difficult for those who are not. Because the game might introduce players to Tamil cuisine, the recipes have to be representative. Initially, the developers struggled making good puzzles out of the recipes, as Abhi explains: "[South Asian] recipes are usually quite long and complicated and while it was technically possible to make puzzles out of them, it didn't make for very fun gameplay." After doing some research, the developers found that some recipes had puzzles built into them already, they just had to be properly contextualized.

References

External links
 

Upcoming video games scheduled for 2023
Casual games
Cooking video games
Indie video games
Nintendo Switch games
PlayStation 5 games
Puzzle video games
Single-player video games
Video games developed in Canada
Video games set in Canada
Video games set in the 1980s
Windows games
Works about immigration to Canada
Xbox One games
Xbox Series X and Series S games